Calio may refer to:

 Calio, North Dakota, an American city
 Anthony J. Calio (1929–2012), American physicist and executive
 Louisa Calio (born 1947), American writer and performance artist